Beverley Nambozo Nsengiyunva is a Ugandan writer, poet, actress, literary activist, and biographer. She is the founder of the Babishai Niwe (BN) Poetry Foundation formerly The Beverley Nambozo Poetry Award for Ugandan women, which began in 2008 as a platform for promoting poetry. It has since grown to include all African poets and runs as an annual poetry award. In 2014, the award will extend to the entire continent, targeting both men and women. The same year, the foundation will also publish an anthology of poetry from poets of Africa. She is also the founder of the Babishai Niwe Women's Leadership Academy..Nambozo joined the Crossing Borders Scheme British Council Uganda in 2003 under the short stories genre. She was nominated for the August 2009 Arts Press Association (APA) Awards for revitalising poetry in Uganda after initiating the Beverley Nambozo Poetry Award, the first poetry award for Ugandan women.

Nambozo has worked at the Eastern African Sub-Regional Support Institute for The Advancement of Women (EASSI), British Council, as a radio show morning host of two years at 104.1 Power FM in Kampala. She also served as an Audience Relations Manager, conducting regular market surveys. Before that she was a teacher and dance instructor at Rainbow International School in Kampala. Since 1999, she has been in an active dance group that usually holds concerts in and around church and the community. Nambozo has also been involved in several HIV/AIDS sensitisation campaigns amongst youth in secondary schools and universities.

Early life and education

Nambozo was born to Herbert Mugoya and Betty Mugoya. Her father was a diplomat and so she lived in the UK for about eight years of her childhood. She studied at Kampala parents school, Gayaza High School and Makerere College School, before joining Makerere University where she received a Bachelor of Education (literature, English) degree. She has a Certificate in French from Alliance Française de Kampala and a master's degree (Distinction) in creative writing from Lancaster University.

Nambozo was a child when she became interested in poetry. Her father was very artistic, being a diplomat who was very well-traveled. He translated his explorations into the home, which influenced her. The schools she attended also supported writing and reciting during assembly, in class and even in the dormitories. She often composed raps or poems for her dormitory or class and weaved them into dance routines.

Writing

Nambozo is a member of FEMRITE and is the author of Unjumping, a chapbook collection of poetry that was published by erbacce-press in 2010 after she emerged a joint first runner-up in their annual poetry competition. Her hybrid play entitled GA-ad, which she wrote collaboratively with Ugandan playwright Judith Adong, featured as the play of the month at the New York National Black Theater in August 2013. Her story "The Best Non-crier on Purley Avenue" was published at postcolonial.org. She participated in the Caine Blogathon.

Her short stories, poetry and articles have been published in Drumvoices Review, Femrite, Kwani?, Enkare Review, Copperfield Review, Postcolonial text, Feast, Famine and Potluck anthology and other local and international journals. Many of her travel articles on visits to Mexico, Lamu, Kenya, Egypt, Lake Mburo National Park, Kingfisher Resort, Queen Elizabeth National Park, and other places have been published in UGPulse and the New Vision newspaper. In 2013, she was shortlisted for the Poetry Foundation Ghana prize for her poem "I Baptise You with My Child's Blood", and longlisted for Short Story Day Africa prize. Her work has been featured on the Pan-African poetry platform Badilisha Poetry Radio. In 2013, she appeared on BBC Radio 3's Cabaret of the Word. Her poem "Lake Nalubaale. Lake she Uganda" was selected as the Uganda poem for the 2014 Commonwealth Games.

Published works

Poetry collections

Poems

"I baptize you with my child's blood", "Sseebo gwe Wange", "Lamu", in 
 "Microwave", "I will never be you", in 
Ha!Ha!Ha!Ha!, in 
"Unjumping", in 
"Bujumbura", Wasafiri, 2015
"I Baptize You with my Child's Blood", shortlisted for Poetry Foundation Ghana 2013 prize and will be published in the anthology, 2014
"Nyali Beach-Mombasa, Please Boss", in revistamododeusar.blogspot.com, 2014
"Lake Nalubaale. Lake she Uganda", Uganda poem, commonwealth games 2014 
Ga-AD, hybrid poetry and theatre with Judith Adong, performed during the 45th reading, Black Series, New York City, 2013.
"At the Graveyard, Nyali Beach-Mombasa", New Black Magazine, 2011
"Al Qaeda", "Eloped", "High heels" and "Nyali Beach-Mombasa", published in Loamshire Review, a UK magazine, 2010
"Dance Partner", "In the Restaurant" and "Crocodile Farm in Mombasa", published in Drumvoices Revue, A confluence of Literary, Cultural and Vision Arts, published by Southern Illinois University English Department, 2007
"Al Qaeda", published in Kwani? 4, an East African literary journal, 2006

Short stories

"Looking", in 
 "Miss Nandutu", in 
Kampala Kuyiiya, upcoming US academic journal, 2014
"The best non-crier on 50 Purley Avenue" in Postcolonial Journal, Vol. 8, no. 1 (2013)
"A Writer is Never a Prisoner", Femrite, 2004
"My Winter Life", in Copperfield Review, a U.S, publication, 2003
"Splash", in a Water Anthology launched in Netherlands 2003
"Samuka Island", in the Dawn Magazine, 2003
"Writing From The Heart", New Writer magazine, 2003
"My Winter Life", published in Copperfield Review, an online UK magazine, 2003
"Splash", published in Water Stories, by the IRC International Water and Sanitation Centre, 2003

References

External links
"Namboozo starts poetry workshops"
"Caine Prize workshop underlines Uganda’s rise in literature"
"Caine Prize: America, by Chinelo Okparanta"
"The January 2014 Poetry Love Featured Poem and Response"
"a little more… roots & routes"
"A quick look at literary blogs and news across the Diaspora"
"Nii Ayikwei Parkes and Tim Williams talk to Beverley Nambozo"
"How Uganda's female writers found their voice"
"Conversations with Beverley Nambozo at Femrite "
"The Beverley Nambozo Poetry Award 2013"
"FEMRITE (Women Re-writing Uganda) "
"BOOKS THEY READ: Beverley Nambozo Nsengiyunva"
"My romance with poetry "
 Drumvoices Revue, vol. 15 – Beverley Nambozo's poems on are pp. 101–102.
"POETRY SLAM KAMPALA"

Living people
Ugandan women poets
Makerere University alumni
Women biographers
Ugandan women short story writers
Ugandan short story writers
21st-century Ugandan women writers
21st-century Ugandan poets
Alumni of Lancaster University
21st-century biographers
21st-century short story writers
People educated at Gayaza High School
Year of birth missing (living people)